The 1972 Utah gubernatorial election was held on November 7, 1972. Democratic incumbent Cal Rampton defeated Republican nominee Nicholas L. Strike with 69.69% of the vote.

Campaign
It is suggested that Rampton, as a moderate Democrat, was acceptable enough to Utah's Republican Party that in both the 1968 and 1972 elections, they put forward only token candidates. By October 1972, Rampton was seen as very likely to win, with his election appearing "assured" according to The New York Times.

General election

Candidates
Cal Rampton, Democratic
Nicholas L. Strike, Republican

Results

References

1972
Utah
Gubernatorial